The Scout and Guide movement in Dominica (an island nation in the Lesser Antilles region of the Caribbean Sea) is served by
 The Girl Guides Association of Dominica, member of the World Association of Girl Guides and Girl Scouts
 The Scout Association of Dominica, member of the World Organization of the Scout Movement

See also